was a town located in Maniwa District, Okayama Prefecture, Japan.

As of 2003, the town had an estimated population of 3,310 and a density of 23.41 persons per km2. The total area was 141.37 km2.

On March 31, 2005, Yubara, along with the town of Hokubō (from Jōbō District), and towns of Katsuyama, Kuse and Ochiai, and the villages of Chūka, Kawakami, Mikamo and Yatsuka (all from Maniwa District) were merged to create the city of Maniwa.

The historic town is nestled in a ravine and follows the meandering path of the Asahi River. The village is surrounded, on all sides by trees clinging to the hillsides. (There are small logging operations in the region that the bus passes on the way into town.) The town sits at the base of Yubara Dam. There are a number onsen hotels. There is also an outdoor, mixed bathing bath, or rotenburo, by the river. This facility is free. The waters are said to have healing effects on those suffering from diabetes, chronic women's diseases, chronic skin disease, cuts and burns.

Geography
Rivers: Asahi River (The big-3 river through Okayama Prefecture)

Adjoining municipalities
Okayama Prefecture
Katsuyama
Kuse
Mikamo
Kawakami
Yatsuka
Chūka
Shinjō
Kagamino (Former Tomi village)

Education
Yubara Elementary School
Futakawa Elementary School
Yubara Junior High School

Transportation 
Expressways:
Yonago Expressway
Yubara Interchange
National highways:
Route 313
Prefectural roads:
Okayama Prefectural Route 55 (Yubara-Mikamo)
Okayama Prefectural Route 56 (Yubara-Okutsu)
Okayama Prefectural Route 322 (Nakafukuda-Yubara)
Okayama Prefectural Route 323 (Tanemi-Akedo)
Okayama Prefectural Route 326 (Kashinishi-Yubara)
Okayama Prefectural Route 447 (Awadani-Mikamo)

Notable places and events
Yubara Onsen
Yubara Dam (Lake Yubara)

External links
Official website of Maniwa in Japanese
Yubara Onsen

References

Dissolved municipalities of Okayama Prefecture
Tourist attractions in Okayama Prefecture
Hot springs of Japan
Spa towns in Japan
Maniwa